The Latvian National Armed Forces, or NBS, are the armed forces of Latvia. Latvia's defense concept is based on a mobile professional rapid response force and reserve segment that can be called upon relatively fast for mobilization should the need arise. The National Armed Forces consists of Land Forces, Naval Forces, Air Force and National Guard. Its main tasks are to protect the territory of the State; participate in international military operations; and to prevent threats to national security.

Mission
The mission of the National Armed Forces (NAF) is to defend the sovereignty and territorial integrity of the nation and to defend its population against foreign or domestic armed aggression. In order to implement these tasks, the NAF provide for the defence of the nation, its air space and national territorial waters, participate in large scale crisis response operations, perform emergency rescue operations, and participate in international peacekeeping operations.

The main mission of the National Armed Forces is to:

Provide for the inviolability of all national territory, its waters and air space;
Participate in international operations;
Participate in national threat elimination;
Provide for the training of personnel and military reserves;
Ensure modernization and enhancement of professional combat training.

History

War of Independence, peacetime (1919–1940) 
Seasoned general Dāvids Sīmansons was appointed as the first Commander-in-Chief. At the end of the Latvian War of Independence (1918-1920), the Latvian Army consisted of 69,232 men. 

In terms of equipment, the Latvian military during its first independence period (1919-1940) was armed mostly with British weapons and gear. The average Latvian infantry soldier in the 1930s is believed to have carried 31,4 kg of equipment in the winter months, and around 29,1 kg in the summer. The main service rifle was the British Pattern 1914 Enfield, and the amount of standard issue ammunition for an infantry soldier was 45 rounds of .303 (7,7mm) caliber. In addition, troops had access to three different types of hand grenades (defense, attack and rifle grenades). The Latvian Army had acquired a wide variety of machine guns in different calibers, through various means: trophies acquired from hostile forces during the War of Independence, allied donations and subsequent official state purchases. Light machine guns included the French Chauchat, Danish Madsen, and British Lewis gun (which became the main light machine gun of the Latvian Army). The main heavy machine gun was the British Vickers machine gun in the .303 (7,7mm) caliber, although the army also kept Russian PM M1910 machine guns in reserve. In general, the Latvian Army lacked automatic weapons of all calibers, and the ones it did have were becoming increasingly outdated towards the start of World War II (most of the weapons in service were from World War I). In terms of heavy weapons, the Latvian military had acquired a rather large number of different artillery systems in different calibers, around 400 artillery pieces in total (although most of these were outdated and worn out due to heavy use and age). The main artillery gun for infantry support was the British Ordnance QF 18-pounder field gun and British QF 4.5-inch howitzer, although there were also several types of French, German and Russian artillery guns in reserve. For anti-tank weapons, in 1938 the army received the Austrian 47 mm Cannone da 47/32 anti-tank cannons, which were reasonably effective against early World War II tanks. For infantry mortars, a number of 81mm mortars were acquired from Finland some time around the late 1930s, but it is unclear how many were delivered and in service at the start of World War II.

In terms of vehicles, the Latvian military was seriously lacking in motorized transport, and thus had to rely mostly on railroads and horse-drawn carriages for most of its logistics needs. The military leadership did make an effort to solve this problem at the end of the 1930s by purchasing a small number of cars, trucks, artillery tractors and motorbikes, but at the start of World War II, only a small portion of the Latvian military had access to motorized vehicles. In terms of armoured vehicles, the Latvian military had six armoured trains, 18 units of Carden Loyd tankettes, six armoured cars and 27 tanks of various designs and combat abilities. In terms of air power, at the start of World War II the Latvian Air Force had around 52 fighter planes and 48 scout planes, of which only 25 were the relatively modern Gloster Gladiator fighters. Thus, the Latvian military during the interwar era was more or less comparable both in equipment and size to its other Baltic neighbours, such as Estonia, Lithuania and Finland. The Armed Forces were also supported by the volunteer Aizsargi Organization.

World War II and the occupation of the Baltic states (1939–1991) 

However, the most crucial problem and flaw for both the Latvian military and other militaries of the Baltic states on the eve of World War II had to do with the failure to organize effective military cooperation between all the Baltic states in case of a new war in the region. The Latvian command in the interwar period had given very little attention towards any possible coordination of forces with either the Estonian or Lithuanian armies against a possible enemy, and so the Latvian military planned its actions and doctrine in almost complete isolation, oblivious to whatever its neighbours to the north (Estonia) or south (Lithuania) did. This ultimately led to flawed and questionable choices in creating defense plans against both Nazi Germany and the Soviet Union (there were separate plans towards both of these possible aggressors), since the Latvian higher command was unsure as to how Latvia's neighbours would react in the event such a conflict started.

 
After the Soviet occupation of Latvia in June 1940, during which the armed forces did not intervene following orders, the annihilation of the Latvian Army began. The army was first renamed the People's Army of Latvia (Latvian: Latvijas Tautas armija) and in September–November 1940 – the Red Army's 24th Territorial Rifle Corps. The corps comprised the 181st and 183rd Rifle Divisions. In September the corps contained 24,416 men but in autumn more than 800 officers and about 10,000 instructors and soldiers were discharged. The arrests of soldiers continued in the following months. In June 1940, the entire Territorial Corps was sent to Litene camp. Before leaving the camp, Latvians drafted in 1939 were demobilised, and replaced by about 4,000 Russian soldiers from the area around Moscow. On June 10, the corps' senior officers were sent to Russia where they were arrested and most of them shot. On June 14 at least 430 officers were arrested and sent to Gulag camps. After the German attack against the Soviet Union, from June 29 to July 1 more than 1980 Latvian soldiers were demobilised, fearing that they might turn their weapons against the Russian commissars and officers. Simultaneously, many soldiers and officers deserted and when the corps crossed the Latvian border into the Russian SFSR, only about 3,000 Latvian soldiers remained. During and after World War II, many former veterans were a part of the fighters of the anti-Soviet National Partisan resistance movement opposing the continued Soviet occupation.

After restoration of independence (1991–present) 

The origin of the current Latvian armed forces can be traced to the establishment of the Latvian National Guard or Zemessardze on August 23, 1991, which served as the first organized defence force after the restoration of the independence of Latvia. Unlike other Soviet republics, it is one of the military forces in the Baltic states that were not formed from the Baltic Military District. From the beginning, the reconstituted defense forces were modeled according to NATO standards with assistance from the United States, the United Kingdom, Sweden etc. 

A notable moment in the history of the armed forces is the accession to the North Atlantic Treaty Organization on 29 March 2004, after Latvia received a Membership Action Plan in 1999 and, ultimately, an invite was extended to it and six other countries during the 2002 Prague summit. Previously, Latvia co-founded the North Atlantic Cooperation Council in 1991 and joined the Partnership for Peace program in 1994. 

Since the 1990s, personnel of the NAF has been deployed to a number of peacekeeping, training and support missions – the NATO Stabilisation Force in Bosnia and Herzegovina (SFOR) from 1996 to 2004; the Kosovo Force (KFOR) from 2000 to 2009; the NATO training mission in Iraq (NTM-I) from 2005 to 2006, the NATO International Security Assistance Force (ISAF) from 2003 to 2015, the Resolute Support Mission from 2015 to 2021 and others.

In 2007, Latvia abolished conscription, switching to a professional, volunteer-based service model. However, after the start of the Russo-Ukrainian War in 2014, calls for reintroducing mandatory military service reappeared, with the full invasion of Ukraine by Russia in 2022 being a decisive boost to this momentum, despite initial skepticism from the top leadership in the NAF and the Ministry of Defence. In July 2022, Defence Minister Artis Pabriks announced a plan for the re-introduction of military service – officially called the National Defense Service (VAD) – first on a voluntary basis and then in compulsory form at a later date for males aged 18–27, starting from January 2023. The Government of Latvia supported the plan in September, with the next required step being the approval of the Saeima. The Cabinet also supported the proposed transitional period from 2023 to 2028, that the length of the service would be 10 months and that service can be postponed until 26 years of age. Alternative service options would involve serving in a National Guard unit on a part-time basis for 5 years; civil service for those unfit for military service due to health or special military courses for students.

Structure 

The National Armed Forces consist of:

 NAF Joint Headquarters
NAF Commander's Personal Staff
 Land Forces
 Naval Forces
 Air Force
 National Guard
 Special Operations Command
 Military Police
 NAF Staff Battalion
 Training and Doctrine Command
 Support Command

The Security Service of the Parliament and State President was a part of the National Armed Forces until its merger with the Military Police in 2009.

Personnel

Latvian National Armed Forces consist of the Regular Force, National Guard and Reserve. On January 1, 2007, conscription was abolished and since then the Regular Force consists of only professional soldiers. Recruits must be 18 years of age or older. As of June 2018, there were 5500 active duty soldiers, 8000 national guards. By the end of 2017, there were 7900 registered reserve soldiers, of whom about 5000 were retired professional soldiers. According to the National Defence Concept, the National Armed Forces are to maintain 2500 militarily trained personnel, including 6500 professional soldiers, 8005 National Guards and 3010 (trained) reserve soldiers. Reserve training began in 2015.

Operations

International cooperation 

Along with providing for national defence, the NAF will also react immediately to threats to other allies and to international crises.

Latvia cooperates with Estonia and Lithuania in the infantry battalion BALTBAT and naval squadron BALTRON which are available for peacekeeping operations.

Currently, NATO is involved in the patrolling and protection of the Latvian air space as the Latvian military does not have the means to do so. For this goal a rotating force of four NATO fighters, which comes from different nations and switches at two or three month intervals, is based in Lithuania to cover all three Baltic states (see Baltic Air Policing).

Current operations

Modernization
After joining the North Atlantic Treaty Organization (NATO), Latvia has undertaken obligations to strengthen common defence within the scope of its capabilities. For this purpose, every NATO member state delegates its military formations — fast response, well-armed and well-equipped units capable to operate beyond the NATO's borders.

After joining NATO, the foundation of the Latvian defence system has shifted from total territorial defence to collective defence. Latvia has acquired small but highly professional troop units that have been fully integrated into NATO structures. NAF soldiers have participated in international operations since 1996. Specialized units (e.g. units of military medics, military police, unexploded ordnance neutralizers, military divers and special forces) have been established in order to facilitate and enhance NAF participation in international operations. Special attention has been paid to establishing a unit to deal with the identification and clearance of nuclear pollution.

List of military equipment

Citations

References

External links 

 National Armed Forces of Latvia Official Website
 Ministry of Defence of the Republic of Latvia
 Mission of Latvia to NATO
 Camopedia (a collection of Latvian camouflage patterns
 Sargs.lv (The official news site of the National Armed Forces)
 Stefan Marx, "The Latvian Defence System", Jane's Intelligence Review, December 1993, pp. 557–559.

 
Permanent Structured Cooperation
Defence agencies
Government agencies of Latvia
1919 establishments in Latvia